Albert Joseph Widmar (March 20, 1925 – October 15, 2005) was an American pitcher, pitching coach, scout and front-office executive in Major League Baseball (MLB). In addition to forging a 59-year career in professional baseball, he also played professional basketball for three seasons.

Widmar appeared in 114 games over all or part of five MLB seasons (–, –) for the Boston Red Sox, St. Louis Browns and Chicago White Sox.

Playing career
Widmar was born in Cleveland, Ohio, where he attended Cathedral Latin High School.

He was originally signed by the Boston Red Sox in 1942, and played Minor League Baseball (MiLB) throughout the war years. Widmar made his MLB debut with Boston at Fenway Park on April 25, 1947, and appeared in two early-season games as a relief pitcher before returning to the minors. On November 17, 1947, the Red Sox packaged him in the blockbuster trade with the St. Louis Browns that brought All-Star shortstop Vern Stephens to Boston. After an unspectacular  campaign with the Browns, he was demoted to St. Louis' Triple-A affiliate, the Baltimore Orioles of the International League. In 1949, with Baltimore, Widmar won 22 games to lead the league and was named an All-Star. In 1950, he returned to the Browns, mainly as a starting pitcher. After going 11–24 in 62 games over two seasons for a Browns team that lost a combined 198 games, Widmar was traded to the Chicago White Sox along with Sherm Lollar for Dick Littlefield, Joe DeMaestri, Gus Niarhos and Jim Rivera. 

But after appearing in only one game with the White Sox, a two-inning relief stint on April 17, 1952, against the Cleveland Indians, Widmar was shipped back to the minors, where he spent the rest of his playing career. He finished 1952 with the Seattle Rainiers of the Pacific Coast League, and remained with the Rainiers through the early weeks of the  season, winning 20 games in both 1952 and 1953. After eight appearances for Seattle in 1955, he donned a Tulsa Oilers uniform; he won 18 games that year, then at 31 he became the Oilers' player/manager from 1956 through 1958. 

In all or parts of five MLB seasons, Widmar posted a 13–30 record, with 143 strikeouts, and a 5.21 earned run average (ERA), in  innings pitched. He surrendered 461 hits and 176 bases on balls. In 42 games started, he registered 12 complete games and one shutout, a three-hitter over the Philadelphia Athletics on September 12, 1950, at Shibe Park. Widmar posted six saves in 72 relief appearances.

Beginning in the late-1940s, Widmar began to play professional basketball in the off-season — in order to keep himself in shape. He played for the Binghamton Triplets of the Eastern Professional Basketball League (EPBL), and the Scranton Miners and Allentown / Carbondale Aces of the American Basketball League (ABL).

Coaching career
The Tulsa Oilers became an affiliate of the Philadelphia Phillies in 1957, and in 1959, Widmar took on new responsibilities as the Phillies' roving minor-league pitching instructor. After three years in that job, he was promoted to the major-league Phillies, serving as pitching coach on the staff of manager Gene Mauch from 1962 through , a period which saw the Phils rise from last place in the National League to three over-.500 seasons. 

In , they joined the ranks of the NL's pennant contenders; the team broke from the gate quickly, took over first place, and maintained their lead by a comfortable margin. By September 20, they had won 90 out of 150 games, and sported a 6-game lead over second-place Cincinnati and St. Louis with a dozen games left to play. But that month, three middle-rung members of the starting rotation began to struggle with injuries and ineffectiveness, causing the club to rely almost exclusively on staff aces Jim Bunning and Chris Short. A loss to Cincinnati on the 21st kicked off a ten-game Philadelphia losing streak and a wild, four-club pennant scramble, with the Phillies finishing second, one game from the championship, won by the Cardinals on the season's last day. That off-season, Widmar was reassigned to his former job as the organization's minor-league pitching instructor. By the late 1960s, however, the club had reverted to its losing ways and Widmar departed the organization after the  campaign.

In 1970 he joined the Milwaukee Brewers, then in the American League, as minor-league pitching coach. After only one season, the Brewers promoted Widmar to director of player development. Along the way, he briefly filled in as interim manager of Brewer farm teams in both 1971 and 1972. In July of  he came down from the front office to replace Bob Shaw as major-league pitching coach on Del Crandall's staff. After a season and a half, he returned to Milwaukee's farm system as director of player development, then field coordinator of instruction, before leaving the Brewers after a front-office overhaul that followed their  season. In 1978 and 1979, he served as a minor-league pitching instructor for the Baltimore Orioles — once again briefly filling in as a manager, this time for eight games as skipper of the Triple-A Rochester Red Wings in 1978.

In , Widmar was named the Toronto Blue Jays’ pitching coach; he kept the job for the next ten seasons. By , Widmar was guiding a rotation that featured Dave Stieb, Doyle Alexander, Jim Clancy, and Jimmy Key, as the Jays won their first American League East Division title. He held that assignment through the  season, a period that included Toronto's triumphs in the 1992 and 1993 World Series.

On October 15, 2005, Al Widmar died of colon cancer in Tulsa, Oklahoma, at age 80.

References

External links

Al Widmar at SABR (Baseball BioProject)
Al Widmar at  Baseball Almanac
Al Widmar at  Baseballbiography.com
Al Widmar at  Pura Pelota (Venezuelan Professional Baseball League)
Slam ! Sports
Ten great moments in pennant races
Al Widmar at The Deadball Era

1925 births
2005 deaths
American Basketball League (1925–1955) players
American expatriate baseball players in Venezuela
Baltimore Orioles (IL) players
Baseball coaches from Ohio
Baseball players from Cleveland
Boston Red Sox players
Canton Terriers players
Carbondale Aces players
Caribbean Series managers
Chicago White Sox players
Deaths from cancer in Oklahoma
Deaths from colorectal cancer
Leones del Caracas players
Louisville Colonels (minor league) players
Major League Baseball farm directors
Major League Baseball pitchers
Major League Baseball pitching coaches
Milwaukee Brewers coaches
Milwaukee Brewers scouts
Minor league baseball coaches
Minor league baseball managers
Philadelphia Phillies coaches
Rochester Red Wings managers
St. Louis Browns players
Scranton Miners (basketball) players
Scranton Red Sox players
Seattle Rainiers players
Toronto Blue Jays coaches
Toronto Blue Jays scouts
Tulsa Oilers (baseball) players
American expatriate baseball people in the Dominican Republic